Otgar  (died 21 April 847), also spelled Odgar or Otger, was the archbishop of Mainz from 826 until his death.

During the years 838–839, Otgar supported Louis the Pious against his son Louis the German who was in rebellion and trying to get all of East Francia under his control. He remained strongly opposed to the younger Louis even after the elder's death in 840. He supported Lothair I in the civil war that lasted until 843. In 842, he even tried to prevent Louis the German from meeting Charles the Bald and allying with him against Lothair. When Otgar finally died, Louis's hold on East Francia strengthened under his successor, Rabanus Maurus.

Sources
Annales Fuldenses (Manchester Medieval series, Ninth-Century Histories, Volume II.) Reuter, Timothy (trans.) Manchester: Manchester University Press, 1992. 

Archbishops of Mainz
9th-century archbishops
847 deaths

Bishops in the Carolingian Empire

Year of birth unknown